Gwen, or the Book of Sand is a 1985 French animated science fiction film written and directed by Jean-François Laguionie, using gouache. It is alternatively known as Gwen, Gwen and the Book of Sand, Gwen, the Book of Sand and similar variations.

Plot
Gwen is a young girl adopted by a nomad tribe in a desert post-apocalyptic world. In the desert, where only few animals, like ostriches or scorpions, can survive, a mysterious entity regularly drops gigantic replicas of everyday life objects from our world, such as bags, telephones, clocks and armchairs. When a young boy, Gwen's friend, is kidnapped by said entity, Gwen and an old woman called Roseline start on a trip to bring him back. They eventually encounter other people living in an isolated city and preserving remains of the old civilisation in strange ways.

Cast
 Michel Robin as Roseline
 Lorella Di Cicco as Gwen
 Armand Babel as first twin
 Raymond Jourdan as second twin
 Saïd Amadis as nomad
 Bertrand Bautheac as nomad
 Jacques Bourier as nomad

Accolades
The film won the Grand Prix de la critique at the Annecy International Animated Film Festival, and the feature-length film award in the Los Angeles festival.

See also
 Cinema of France
 History of French animation
 List of animated feature films
 List of science-fiction films of the 1980s

References

External links
 
 

1985 films
1985 animated films
1980s science fiction films
1980s French animated films
Films directed by Jean-François Laguionie
French animated science fiction films
1980s French-language films
Animated post-apocalyptic films
Annecy Cristal for a Feature Film winners